The Monahans Sandhills State Park is a  state park located in the southern Llano Estacado in Ward County and Winkler County, Texas.  The closest major town is Monahans, Texas, and the closest limited-access highway ingress is Exit 86 on Interstate 20.

Features
Although desert-like, the Monahans Sandhills are not a desert; they are a part of a semi-arid ecosystem (average annual rainfall ) characterized by the presence of both groundwater and relatively nutrient-poor windblown sand. The Shinoak (Quercus havardii) is a local climax shrub, an unusual type of oak tree which because of local conditions often achieves full growth of only  in height. Most of a Shinoak's biomass exists in the form of a lengthy root system reaching down to groundwater. If a Monahans sand dune has become stabilized and has stopped blowing about in the wind, that is often because a small grove of Shinoaks have stabilized the dune with their extensive root systems. Despite the sterility of the landscape, various rodents are relatively common, and several packs of Sandhills coyotes feed upon them.

Much of the Monahans Sandhills are privately owned property.  The state of Texas is operating a 99-year lease with the Sealy-Smith Foundation for the ranch on which most of the land of the state park is located; the park opened to the public in 1957, and the state park has leasehold rights to this parcel of the sand hills until 2056.

The Monahans Sandhills are part of the Permian Basin of hydrocarbon formations, and some oil production continues in and around the state park.

Visitors practice several local forms of recreation at the Monahans Sandhills, such as sandboarding, 'sand football', 'sand surfing', and sand tobogganing.

Geology
The Monahans Sandhills consist of a sand deposits 70 miles long and 20 miles wide from Crane County, Texas to Andrews County, Texas.  The Llano Estacado escarpment to the east is a barrier to further wind transport of sediment.  The sand probably reached its greatest areal extent in the Late Pleistocene, 16,000 years before the present, with an earlier period of dune building 25,000 years before the present.  The dunes consist of almost pure quartz grains with an average diameter of less than 0.22 mm, which is fairly uniform for all of the grains.  Dune types include coppice, wind-shadow, Akle, Barchan, and parabolic.  Winds from the southeast in the summer, from the northwest in the winter, and the southwest during spring, influence dune shape.  These changes in wind directions change the shapes of the dunes and their position, but in general the dunes don't migrate, retaining their position and form when measured year to year.

See also
Big Spring State Park
Mescalero Ridge
Odessa Meteor Crater
Pecos River

References

External links

Monahans Sandhills State Park - official site
Handbook of Texas: Monahans Sandhills State Park
Sibley Nature Center: Monahans Sandhills
Photos of the Llano Estacado
Home movie of the Baylor family visiting Monahans from the Texas Archive of the Moving Image

State parks of Texas
Dunes of the United States
Protected areas of Ward County, Texas
Protected areas of Winkler County, Texas
1957 establishments in Texas